Intel has historically named integrated circuit (IC) development projects after geographical names of towns, rivers or mountains near the location of the Intel facility responsible for the IC. Many of these are in the American West, particularly in Oregon (where most of Intel's CPU projects are designed; see famous codenames). As Intel's development activities have expanded, this nomenclature has expanded to Israel and India, and some older codenames refer to celestial bodies.

The following table lists known Intel codenames along with a brief explanation of their meaning and their likely namesake, and the year of their earliest known public appearance. Most processors after a certain date were named after cities that could be found on a map of the United States. This was done for trademark considerations. Banias was the last of the non-US city names. Gesher was renamed to Sandy Bridge to comply with the new rule. Dothan is a city both in Israel and in Alabama.

See also

 List of Intel microprocessors

References

External links
 Intel ARK (Automated Relational Knowledgebase)
 The Register: Intel Penryn codename decoder
 Intel CPU Transition Roadmap 2008–2013
 Intel Desktop CPU Roadmap 2004–2011

 Codenames
Lists of computer terms
Code names